Dwayne Washington may refer to:

Dwayne Washington (American football), NFL running back
Dwayne Washington (basketball), NBA point guard

See also
 Dewayne Washington, NFL cornerback
 Duane Washington (born 1964), American basketball player
 Duane Washington Jr. (born 2000), American basketball player